Jill Helen Barrow (born 26 April 1951) is a British company director and former public administrator.

Early life 
Jill Helen Barrow was born on 26 April 1951, the daughter of Philip Eric Horwood and Mavis Mary, née Handscombe. She received a Certificate of Education from the University of Durham in 1972, and then completed a Bachelor of Arts (BA) degree at the Open University in 1980, before returning to Durham and completed a Master of Education (MEd) course in 1983.

Career 
Barrow was a teacher in secondary schools and further education colleges between 1972 and 1986, when she began working in education management and inspection. Between 1990 and 1993, she was Director of Education at Essex County Council and then took up the same role at Surrey County Council until 1995, when she was appointed Chief Executive of Lincolnshire County Council; she was the first woman to become the chief executive of a county council in England.

Barrow left Lincolnshire CC in 1998, a year after the Conservative group on the Council secured a majority and took over from the Labour–Liberal Democrat coalition that had governed since 1993. According to the Leader of the Labour Group on the Council Rob Parker, the Conservative leadership, headed by Jim Speechley, began a "scorched earth" policy of removing coalition appointees from the council's executive. Barrow was given a severance payment amounting to £160,000. Auditors later found this payment to be unlawful, also commenting on the "absence of justification for payments of such magnitude". Speechley was forced to resign as leader in 2002 and was jailed in 2004 over a separate incident, while his successor as leader, Ian Croft, was later found to have "breached the code of conduct for people in public office" over his relations with Barrow's successor as Chief Executive, David Bowles, who had been a whistleblower in the Speechley scandal.

After Barrow left Lincolnshire CC, she was appointed Chief Executive of the South-West of England Regional Development Agency, serving between 1999 and 2001. She was a Board Member for England on the National-Lottery-funded New Opportunities Fund from 1999 to 2004. Barrow was then a director at the consultancy firm GatenbySanderson until 2006, when she took up a directorship at the leadership consultancy company Big Blue Experience; as of 2016, she remains in that role.

References 

Living people
1951 births
21st-century English businesswomen
21st-century English businesspeople
Alumni of Durham University
Alumni of the Open University